Assara halmophila is a species of snout moth in the genus Assara. It was described by Edward Meyrick in 1929. It is found on the Marquesas Islands and the Society Islands.

References

Moths described in 1929
Phycitini
Moths of Oceania